The 2010–11 season of the Liga I Feminin was the 21st season of Romania's premier women's football league. The season started on 18 September 2010 and ended on 12 June 2011. Olimpia Cluj won the championship in its first season. Olimpia's striker Cosmina Duşa scored over 100 goals this season.

Teams 
Inter Sibiu and Intercredo Piteşti withdrew form the championship after the end of the last season. New teams entered the first league: Olimpia Cluj, Real Craiova, CS Brazi and FC Nicolae Dobrin. After the first round Smart Sport București withdrew due to financial problems. Another team that withdrew, but after the half season, was FC Nicolae Dobrin. They lost all their remaining matches with 3–0.

Stadia and locations

Standings

References

External links
 Official site

Rom
Fem
Romanian Superliga (women's football) seasons